William McOuat Cottingham (January 8, 1905 – March 20, 1983) was a Canadian provincial politician. He was the Union Nationale member of the Legislative Assembly of Quebec for Argenteuil from 1948 to 1966. He was the Minister of Mines from 1954 to 1960. He was also mayor of Saint-Jérusalem-d'Argenteuil (Lachute), Quebec from 1951 to 1953.

References

1905 births
1982 deaths
Mayors of places in Quebec
People from Lachute
Union Nationale (Quebec) MNAs